Disculella is a genus of air-breathing land snails, terrestrial pulmonate gastropod mollusks in the family Geomitridae, the hairy snails and their allies.

Species
Species within the genus Disculella include:
 Disculella compar (R. T. Lowe, 1831)
 Disculella madeirensis (W. Wood, 1828)
 Disculella spirulina  (T. D. A. Cockerell, 1921)

References

External links
 Pilsbry, H. A. (1893-1895). Manual of conchology, structural and systematic, with illustrations of the species. Ser. 2, Pulmonata. Vol. 9: Helicidae, Vol. 7, Guide to the study of Helices. pp 1-225, pls 1-61. Philadelphia, published by the Conchological Section, Academy of Natural Sciences
 Lowe, R. T. (1852). Brief diagnostic notices of new Maderan land shells. The Annals and Magazine of Natural History. (2) 9 (50): 112-120; (2) 9 (52): 275-279. London

 
Geomitridae
Taxonomy articles created by Polbot